Elachista pusilla is a moth of the family Elachistidae. It is found in the United States, where it has been recorded from Texas.

The forewings are blackish gray with a double, crescent-shaped, outwardly convex transverse white band, as well as a similar but moderately broad transverse band. Darker, blackish scales form an indistinct spot toward the apex. The hindwings are gray.

References

pusilla
Moths described in 1876
Moths of North America